The Reissert reaction is a series of chemical reactions that transforms quinoline to quinaldic acid.  Quinolines will react with acid chlorides and potassium cyanide to give 1-acyl-2-cyano-1,2-dihydroquinolines, also known as Reissert compounds.  Hydrolysis gives the desired quinaldic acid.

The Reissert reaction is also successful with isoquinolines and most pyridines.

Several reviews have been published.

References
  
  
  Weinstock, J.; Boekelheide, V. Organic Syntheses, Coll. Vol. 4, p. 641 (1963); Vol. 38, p. 58 (1958). (Article)
  Uff, B. C.; Kershaw, J. R.; Neumeyer, J. L. Organic Syntheses, Coll. Vol. 6, p. 115 (1988); Vol. 56, p. 19 (1977). (Article)
  Mosettig, E. Org. React. 1954, 8, 220. (Review)
   (Review)
   (Review)

Further reading

Addition reactions
Name reactions